Strada Sforii (meaning "Rope Street") is the narrowest street in the city of Brașov, Romania. It is believed to be one of the narrowest streets in Europe (L'Androuno, in France, Spreuerhofstraße, in Germany, and Parliament Street, in England, are narrower).

It is situated near Șchei Gate and it is perpendicular to Strada Cerbului (Stag Street). It was initially built as a corridor that firemen could use, and it is first mentioned in 17th century documents. Strada Sforii is now a tourist attraction and meeting spot.

Gallery

See also 
 L'Androuno: A narrow street in France
 Fan Tan Alley: A narrow street in Canada
 Mårten Trotzigs Gränd: A narrow street in Sweden
 Parliament Street, Exeter: A narrow street in the United Kingdom
 Spreuerhofstraße: A narrow street in Germany

References

Brașov
Streets in Romania
Tourist attractions in Brașov